Fuzztastic Planet Festival is a rock festival held in Prosotsani, Drama, Greece. It is one of the most well-known music festivals in Greece. The festival's history begins back in 2013. The festival held in one of the most beautiful landscapes in Northern Greece, a lavish piece of nature surrounded by the ranges of mount Falakro, the Kokkinogia Lake .

2015 lineup

2014 lineup

2013 lineup
The festival took place in Almyra Beach, Kavala

Rock festivals in Greece
Summer events in Greece